Gotalovo  is a village in Gola municipality, Koprivnica-Križevci County, in northeastern Croatia. Its population in 2011 was 344.

References

Populated places in Koprivnica-Križevci County